Kaleem Usmani (born Ehtisham Ilahi; 28 February 1928  28 August 2000) was a Pakistani Urdu poet who wrote ghazals, naats, patriotic songs and more than one hundred songs for thirty-seven Urdu films. However, he earned recognition as a lyricist by winning 2 Nigar Awards as 'Best Lyricist' in 1973 and 1978.

He worked at Pakistan Television Corporation and Radio Pakistan besides working for Pakistan films during which he wrote lyrics for Urdu films.

Early life 
Kaleem Usmani was born Ehtisham Ilahi in Saharanpur, British India on 28 February 1928, in a family related to the Shabbir Ahmad Usmani. After partition of the Indian subcontinent, he migrated to Pakistan and lived his life in Lahore city.

Career 
Prior to migration, he learnt poetry from his father Fazal Ilahi. When he settled in Lahore, he took poetry classes from Ehsan Danish. He was often invited to mushairas and subsequently he was offered work in films as a lyricist. His first film was Intekhab (1955). The film flopped at the box office and later he wrote songs for Bara Aadmi (1957), including "Kahe Jalana Dil Ko Chhoro" which became one of the prominent songs in the country. In 1959, he wrote songs, including "Mithi Mithi Batiyon Se" for Raaz film which helped him to retain his position in film industry. In 1966, he wrote songs for Hum Dono and Jalwa. Songs "Koi Ja Ke Unse Keh De" and "Laagi Re Lagan" from the film Jalwa became prominent songs in Pakistan. In 1969, he wrote songs for Nazneen and Andaleeb

Patriotic songs 
In 1973, he wrote Pakistani patriotic song "Tera Saya Jaha Bhi Ho" for Gharana film for which he was awarded a Nigar Award. His other patriotic songs include "Is Parcham Ke Saye Taley" and "Ye Watan Tumhara Hai".

Death 
He died on 28 August 2000 in Lahore and is buried in a cemetery of Lahore.

Awards

References

Further reading

External links 
Kaleem Usmani at Rekhta

1928 births
2000 deaths
Muhajir people
Poets from Lahore
20th-century Pakistani poets
Urdu-language poets from Pakistan
Pakistani male poets
Pakistani songwriters
Urdu-language lyricists
Nigar Award winners